Albert Speer (1905–1981) was a German architect and Nazi minister

Albert Speer may also refer to:

 Albert Speer (play), a 2000 play by David Edgar
 Albert Friedrich Speer (1863–1947), German architect, father of Albert Speer
 Albert Speer (born 1934) (1934–2017), German architect and urban planner, son of Albert Speer

See also
 Albert Spear (1852–1929), judge and politician in Maine

Speer, Albert